¡Nailed it! México is a Mexican Netflix original series which premiered on February 8, 2019, as a spin-off of Nailed It!. The series is a reality bake-off competition, in the style of reality television. Three amateur bakers compete to replicate complicated cakes and confectionery in order to win a 200,000 pesos cash prize and a "¡Nailed It!" trophy. A second season was released on August 7, 2020. A third season was released on January 5, 2021.

Premise 
¡Nailed it! México was inspired by the craze of people trying and failing to make elaborate cakes they found on the Internet. Three amateur bakers with demonstrated poor baking skills attempt to re-create edible masterpieces for a $10,000 prize and the "¡Nailed it!" trophy. Competitors take part in two challenges over the course of the 35-minute episodes; their efforts are judged by co-hosts Omar Chaparro and Anna Ruiz, joined by a different guest judge each episode.

The first challenge is called "Baker's Choice", where the contestants pick one of three existing confectionery treats and try to recreate it. The winner of this challenge gets a special prize and is allowed to wear a golden chef's hat.

In the second challenge, "Nail It or Fail It", contestants have two hours to recreate a complicated cake from scratch. They each receive a "Panic Button" which allows them to get three minutes of assistance from one of the judges. The worst-performing baker from the first challenge gets a second button to distract the other bakers.

Cast
 Omar Chaparro, host
 Anna Ruiz, host

Episodes 
The winners of the 200,000 pesos and the "¡Nailed It!" trophy each episode are listed in bold.

Season 1 (2019)

Season 2 (2020)

Season 3 (2021)

Release 
All six episodes of the first season were released on Netflix on February 8, 2019; Sylvia Weinstock appears in one episode as a guest judge. The second season was released on Netflix on August 7, 2020. The third season was released on January 5, 2021, with six episodes.

References 

Spanish-language Netflix original programming
Mexican reality television series
2019 Mexican television series debuts
Food reality television series
2010s Mexican television series
Reality television spin-offs
Mexican television series based on American television series
Television series by Magical Elves
Reality competition television series